The Central Student Association (also known as the CSA) is the student union for all undergraduate students at the University of Guelph.

History

The current CSA is the third iteration of a central student union on the Guelph campus. It was founded in 1973. 
The first cross-College student government was Union Council which lasted from the end of World War Two until 1970 when—because of a major disagreement over the University Centre—the University drove it into bankruptcy and dissolution.

In 1966 students agreed to fund a "Student Union Building" with no university operations in it at all. In 1968 they agreed—again by referendum—to fund an expanded building which was to be called the University Community Centre which would house university run services that students needed to directly access such as counselling services, registration and financial aid.

By 1970 the University decided that the building would be all that and also house all administration functions as well. Union Council claimed that such a building would violate the terms of the referendum and therefore they should build what the students said they wanted or return the money collected. The University countered by saying that the newly incorporated Union Council (which changed its name to the University of Guelph Student Union) had no say in how the fees collected would be spent, that they didn't "recognize" this new entity as the legitimate student government. At the same time, the University decided that fees paid to the Union Council (which they had collected up to this point and gave over to the new "Student Union" that they claimed had no standing) should be voluntary. They stopped collecting the fee and that soon drove the organization into bankruptcy. With no money to operate or to fight the University Centre battle with, the organization dissolved itself.

The second student "government" was the Committee of College Presidents (OAC, OVC, Mac, and Arts). It was a loose association whose main function was to make sure that social events and some services (such as the Ontarion) would survive. It lasted only three years—long enough for the University to take the student money and build the building they'd decided on. The Committee didn't do much except to create a real student government called the University of Guelph Central Student (note the singular "student") Association. It was first known as UGCSA, but it lost the UG a couple of years later and by 1977 it was known by all as the CSA. Unlike the Committee, it was a directly elected body, and soon an incorporated one.

One of its first actions was to sue the University for breach of trust over the University Centre. 
The CSA worked to regain student control of the UC from the University in the 1970s and finally settled out of court on the matter, establishing a University Centre Board with a majority of student representatives. Students continue to pay a fee for the building.

From 1973 until 1993 the CSA had a structure with a President and Vice Presidents (varying in number) and a voting council made up of reps from the Colleges (one appointed by the College Student Government and two voted in "at large"). After 1993 the structure has been flattened, with various kinds of Commissioners and Spokespeople representing the various (and changing) efforts of the Association. In addition there are now voting places for other student organizations and groups as well as the Colleges.

The CSA is a member local of the Canadian Federation of Students (CFS) since 1987. In 2010, students vote to hold a decertification referendum from the national and provincial chapters of the CFS.  The vote is challenged in court. The referendum is held under parameters outlined by the judge. In 2012, the CFS is granted an appeal by the Ontario Court of Appeal, due to the 2010 judge’s failure to provide reasons for his decision in the original referendum court case, rendering the referendum no longer binding. Membership with CFS is continued. In 2013, the CSA continued correspondence with the University, requesting recollection of CFS fees, but without success. The CSA Board of Directors passes a motion to file a joint application with the CFS, to put the University’s uncollected membership fees before a judge. The dispute of uncollected fees is settled in 2017 with a settlement between the CSA Board of Directors with CFS and the University of Guelph Administration

About

The CSA is a democratically organized, dues paying student union representing over 16,000 full and part-time undergrad students at the University of Guelph.

The purpose of the CSA is to bring together the elected representatives of all the college governments on campus. The CSA also has appointed members of campus organizations into a single body. The CSA provides services such as a health plan, the universal bus pass, and the Student Help and Advocacy Centre. The CSA also owns and operates the Bullring campus pub, and also has a controlling stake on the Board of Directors for the University Centre. Many Campus Organizations and Clubs are recognized under the CSA, and together with the different club offices, occupy over half of the second floor of the University Centre.

Administration

The student government is administered by four full-time undergraduate executives.
These executives are:
 President
VP Student Experience
VP Academic
VP External

The day-to-day operations are overseen by the elected Executive, who also lead various campaigns and advocate for all undergraduate students with the assistance of full-time staff members. The CSA employs a number of part-time student service staff.

The elected and appointed Board of Directors holds open meetings every two weeks throughout the school year and over the summer semester, though emergency meetings are also called when needed with 48 hours notice. The general membership meets annually to review the auditor's report, ratify changes made to the CSA's by-laws by the Board of Directors, and provide ground level participation to the operation of the CSA.

Elections
Elections are held every Winter semester to select the next years Executive and Board. Hiring for most part-time positions takes place in the winter semester as well. For vacancies in the Executive and/or Board of Directors positions, a Fall By-Election takes place in the following Fall Semester.

Board of Directors
CSA Board of Directors meet four times per semester. Board meetings are scheduled in advance, and are held on Wednesdays. In the summer months, the board meetings are held in the CSA Boardroom, and in the Fall and Winter semesters, they usually meet in a larger room in the University Centre. All the Board meetings are open to the public, and are traditionally begun with a motion to extend speaking rights to all present, so that visitors may contribute to the process. Only members of the Board of Directors hold voting rights.

Votes on the CSA Board of Directors by 14 At-Large individuals (elected, 2 per college), 7 College Governments (appointed), and 9 student organizations (appointed).In the Commissioner structure, all five executive had votes. With the new structure, the executive act as passive board members who can motivate and introduce motions, but cannot vote.

Executive Commissioners
reference - https://web.archive.org/web/20120302194409/http://studentlife.uoguelph.ca/lce/navigate/lead/resources * and http://www.csaonline.ca/executive/

In the 2016-2017 year, the UofG CSA voted to return to a hierarchical structure. The following are the executive who served the CSA between 2003 and 2017.

Services
The CSA provides a number of services to its constituency. These include:
The Bullring 
Universal Student Bus Pass (with the Graduate Student Union)
thecannon.ca (in partnership with the Guelph Campus Co-Op)
SafeWalk
Guelph Student FoodBank
The Bike Centre
CSA Clubs
Health and Dental Plan
Student Help and Advocacy Centre (SHAC)
Printing & Promotional Services

See also 
List of Ontario students' associations

References

External links 

University of Guelph
Ontario students' associations